Livada is a commune in Arad County, Romania. Livada commune is situated on the Arad Plateau, northward from Arad. The commune stretches over 2013 hectares and is composed of two villages, Livada (situated at 10 km from Arad) and Sânleani (Szentleányfalva).

Population
According to the last census the population of the commune counts 2892 inhabitants, out of which 86,6% are Romanians, 11,3% Hungarians, 1,5% Germans and 0,6% are of other or undeclared nationalities.

History
The first documentary record of Livada dates back to 1553, while Sânleani was first mentioned in 1302.

Economy
Although the commune's economy is mainly agrarian, at present it can be characterized by a powerful dynamic force with
significant developments in all the sectors present in the commune. Its closeness to the county capital has made possible
the dynamism of services and the intensification of economic relations with the town.

References

Communes in Arad County
Localities in Crișana